is the twentieth single by Japanese recording artist Alisa Mizuki. It was released on February 6, 2002, over a year and a half since "Megami no Mai" (2000), as the third single from Mizuki's fourth compilation album History: Alisa Mizuki Complete Single Collection.

The title track was written by lyricist Hiromi Mori, composed by The Alfee guitarist Toshihiko Takamizawa, and arranged by Keiichi Ueno. It served as second ending theme (episodes 13-30) for the TV Tokyo anime Hikaru no Go. CDJournal described the song as a "catchy and reminiscent of The Alfee circa 1980s" and praised Mizuki's "upbeat" vocals. The single also includes a remix of "Hitomi no Chikara" and the B-side "Subete wa Kaze no Naka de," written and produced by Seikou Nagaoka.

Chart performance 
"Hitomi no Chikara" debuted on the Oricon Weekly Singles chart at number 33 with 7,700 copies sold in its first week. The single charted for three weeks and has sold a total of 15,280 copies.

Track listing

Charts and sales

References 

2002 singles
Alisa Mizuki songs